Florsheim is a surname. People with the surname include:

Bobby Florsheim (born 1969), American screenwriter
Harold M. Florsheim (fl. 1920s), businessman and builder of the Harold Florsheim House
Lillian Florsheim (1896–1988), American sculptor
Milton S. Florsheim (1868–1936), chairman and founder of Florsheim Shoes
Richard A. Florsheim (1916–1979), American painter, lithographer, and sculptor